Mouths and Rabbits (transliterated as Afwah wa araneb) is an Egyptian film released in 1977, produced by the United Film Company, and directed by Henry Barakat.

Synopsis
The film explores issues of poverty and unplanned families. Nima (Faten Hamama lives with her older sister and the latter’s husband Abdulmajid, who have nine children between them. Abdulmajid is an alcoholic railroad worker who neglects his family. The couple decides to marry Nima off to a teacher named Al-Batawi to financially stabilize the household, prompting Nima to flee to Mansoura while Al-Batawi is married with papers Abdulmajid forges. In Mansoura, Nima finds work on the farm of a gentleman named Mahmoud Bey, who falls in love with her after separating from his fiancée. On her return to inform her sister, Nima brings Mahmoud Bey, who encounters a livid Al-Batawi and fights back ending in the latter’s stabbing. Devastated, Abdulmajid acknowledges his error and allows Nima to marry Mahmoud, who takes care of the family as Al-Batawi had promised to do.

Cast
 Faten Hamama
 Mahmoud Yassin
 Farid Shawqi
 Ali El Sherif
 Ragaa Hussein
 Hassan Mustafa
 Magda El-Khatib
 Inas El-Degheidy
 Widad Hamdi
 Abu Bakr Ezzat
 Mohsen Mohieddin
 Ahmed Salama
 Salah Nazmi

External links
 IMDb page
 El Cinema page
 El Film page archived
 Article by Hassan Haddad on the film
 Article by Mostafa Bayoumi on the film from the December 1, 2012 edition of Al-Bawaba
 Post by Muna Butterfly on Blogspot from March 5, 2010

References

20th-century Egyptian films
1977 films
Films directed by Henry Barakat